Émile Binet (27 January 1908 – 26 August 1958) was a Belgian athlete. He competed in the men's long jump at the 1936 Summer Olympics.

References

External links
 

1908 births
1958 deaths
Athletes (track and field) at the 1936 Summer Olympics
Belgian male long jumpers
Belgian decathletes
Olympic athletes of Belgium
Place of birth missing